Nancy Goldin (born September 12, 1953) is an American photographer and activist. Her work often explores LGBT subcultures, moments of intimacy, the HIV/AIDS crisis, and the opioid epidemic. Her most notable work is The Ballad of Sexual Dependency (1986). The monograph documents the post-Stonewall, gay subculture and includes Goldin's family and friends. She is a founding member of the advocacy group P.A.I.N. (Prescription Addiction Intervention Now). She lives and works in New York City.

Early life

Goldin was born in Washington, D.C. in 1953 to middle-class Jewish parents, and grew up in the Boston suburb of Swampscott, moving to Lexington in her teens. Goldin's father worked in broadcasting and served as the chief economist for the Federal Communications Commission. Goldin had early exposure to tense family relationships, sexuality, and suicide, as her parents often argued about Goldin's older sister Barbara who ultimately died by suicide when Goldin was 11:This was in 1965, when teenage suicide was a taboo subject. I was very close to my sister and aware of some of the forces that led her to choose suicide. I saw the role that her sexuality and its repression played in her destruction. Because of the times, the early sixties, women who were angry and sexual were frightening, outside the range of acceptable behavior, beyond control. By the time she was eighteen, she saw that her only way to get out was to lie down on the tracks of the commuter train outside of Washington, D.C. It was an act of immense will.Goldin began to smoke marijuana and date an older man. She left home by age 13 or 14. At 16 she enrolled at the Satya Community School in Lincoln. A Satya staff member (existential psychologist Rollo May's daughter) introduced Goldin to the camera in 1969 when she was sixteen years old. Still struggling from her sister's death, Goldin used the camera and photography to cherish her relationships with those she photographed. She also found the camera as a useful political tool, to inform the public about important issues silenced in America. Her early influences included Andy Warhol's early films, Federico Fellini, Jack Smith, French and Italian Vogue, Guy Bourdin and Helmut Newton.

Life and work 
Goldin's first solo show, held in Boston in 1973, was based on her photographic journeys among the city's gay and transgender communities, to which she had been introduced by her friend David Armstrong. While living in downtown Boston at age 18, Goldin "fell in with the drag queens," living with them and photographing them. Among her work from this period is Ivy wearing a fall, Boston (1973). Unlike some photographers who were interested in psychoanalyzing or exposing the queens, Goldin admired and respected their sexuality. Goldin said, "My desire was to show them as a third gender, as another sexual option, a gender option. And to show them with a lot of respect and love, to kind of glorify them because I really admire people who can recreate themselves and manifest their fantasies publicly. I think it's brave".

Goldin admitted to being romantically in love with a queen during this period of her life in a Q&A with Bomb "I remember going through a psychology book trying to find something about it when I was nineteen. There was one little chapter about it in an abnormal psych book that made it sound so ... I don't know what they ascribed it to, but it was so bizarre. And that's where I was at that time in my life".

Goldin describes her life as having been completely immersed in that of the queens. "I lived with them; it was my whole focus. Everything I did – that's who I was all the time. And that's who I wanted to be". However, upon attending the School of the Museum of Fine Arts in Boston, when her professors told her to go back and photograph queens again, Goldin admitted her work was not the same as when she had lived with them. Goldin graduated from the School of the Museum of Fine Arts in 1977/1978, where she had worked mostly with Cibachrome prints. Her work from this period is associated with the Boston School of Photography.

Following graduation, Goldin moved to New York City. She began documenting the post-punk new-wave music scene, along with the city's vibrant, post-Stonewall gay subculture of the late 1970s and early 1980s. She was drawn especially to the hard-drug subculture of the Bowery neighborhood; these photographs, taken between 1979 and 1986, form her slideshow The Ballad of Sexual Dependency—a title taken from a song in Bertolt Brecht's Threepenny Opera. Later published as a book with help from Marvin Heiferman, Mark Holborn, and Suzanne Fletcher, these snapshot aesthetic images depict drug use, violent, aggressive couples and autobiographical moments. In her foreword to the book she describes it as a "diary [she] lets people read" of people she referred to as her "tribe". Part of Ballad was driven by the need to remember her extended family. Photography was a way for her to hold onto her friends, she hoped.

The photographs show a transition through Goldin's travels and her life. Most of her Ballad subjects were dead by the 1990s, lost either to drug overdose or AIDS; this tally included close friends and often-photographed subjects Greer Lankton and Cookie Mueller. In 2003, The New York Times nodded to the work's impact, explaining Goldin had "forged a genre, with photography as influential as any in the last twenty years." In addition to Ballad, she combined her Bowery pictures in two other series: I'll Be Your Mirror (from a song by The Velvet Underground) and All By Myself.

Goldin's work is most often presented in the form of a slideshow, and has been shown at film festivals; her most famous being a 45-minute show in which 800 pictures are displayed. The main themes of her early pictures are love, gender, domesticity, and sexuality. She has affectionately documented women looking in mirrors, girls in bathrooms and barrooms, drag queens, sexual acts, and the culture of obsession and dependency. In the book Auto-Focus, her photographs are described as a way to "learn the stories and intimate details of those closest to her". The book speaks of her uncompromising manner and style when photographing acts such as drug use, sex, violence, arguments, and traveling and references one of Goldin's photographs "Nan One Month After Being Battered, 1984" as an iconic image which she uses to reclaim her identity and her life.

Goldin's work since 1995 has included a wide array of subject matter: collaborative book projects with Japanese photographer Nobuyoshi Araki; New York City skylines; uncanny landscapes (notably of people in water); her lover, Siobhan; and babies, parenthood and family life.

In 2000, her hand was injured and she currently retains less ability to turn it than in the past.

In 2006, her exhibition, Chasing a Ghost, opened in New York. It was the first installation by her to include moving pictures, a fully narrative score, and voiceover, and included the three-screen slide and video presentation Sisters, Saints, & Sybils. The work involved her sister Barbara's suicide and how she coped through production of numerous images and narratives. Her works are developing more and more into cinemaesque features, exemplifying her gravitation towards working with films.

After some time, her photos moved from portrayals of dangerous youthful abandonment to scenes of parenthood and family life in progressively worldwide settings. Goldin currently resides and works in New York, Paris, as well as London.

Fashion
Goldin has undertaken commercial fashion photography—for Australian label Scanlan & Theodore's Spring/Summer 2010 campaign, shot with model Erin Wasson; for Italian luxury label Bottega Veneta's Spring/Summer 2010 campaign with models Sean O'Pry and Anya Kazakova, evoking memories of her Ballad of Sexual Dependency; for shoemaker Jimmy Choo in 2011 with model Linda Vojtova; and for Dior in 2013, 1000 LIVES, featuring Robert Pattinson.

In March 2018, clothing brand Supreme released a collaborative range with Goldin as part of their Spring/Summer 2018 collection. This consisted of jackets, sweatshirts and t-shirts in various colors, with designs titled "Misty and Jimmy Paulette", "Kim in Rhinestone" and "Nan as a dominatrix".

Activism 

In 2017, in a speech in Brazil, Goldin revealed she was recovering from opioid addiction, specifically to OxyContin, after being prescribed the drug after wrist surgery. She had sought treatment for her addiction and battled through rehab. This led to her setting up a campaign called Prescription Addiction Intervention Now (P.A.I.N.) pursuing social media activism directed against the Sackler family for their involvement in Purdue Pharma, manufacturers of OxyContin. Goldin has said the campaign attempts to contrast the philanthropic contributions of the Sackler family to art galleries, museums and universities with a lack of responsibility taken for the opioid crisis. Goldin became aware of the Sackler family in 2017.

In 2018, she organized a protest in the Sackler Wing's Temple of Dendur at The Metropolitan Museum of Art. The protest called for museums and other cultural institutions not to accept money from the Sackler family.

Also in 2018, she was one of several artists who participated in a $100 sale organized by Magnum Photos and Aperture to raise funds for Goldin's opioid awareness group P.A.I.N. (Prescription Addiction Intervention Now)."I've started a group called P.A.I.N. to address the opioid crisis. We are a group of artists, activists and addicts that believe in direct action. We target the Sackler family, who manufactured and pushed OxyContin, through the museums and universities that carry their name. We speak for the 250,000 bodies that no longer can."In February 2019, Goldin staged a protest at the Guggenheim Museum in New York over its acceptance of funding by the Sackler family.

She also said that she would withdraw from a retrospective exhibition of her work at the National Portrait Gallery in London if they did not turn down a gift of £1 million from the Sacklers. The gallery subsequently said it would not proceed with the donation.

Two days after the National Portrait Gallery statement, the Tate group of British art galleries (Tate Modern and Tate Britain in London, Tate St Ives and Tate Liverpool) announced it would no longer accept any gifts offered by members of the Sackler family, from whom it had received £4m. Tate Modern had been planning to display its copy of Goldin's The Ballad of Sexual Dependency slideshow, for a year from April 15, 2019. Goldin had not discussed the show with Tate.

Goldin identified that Tate, which has received Sackler money, paid her for one of the ten copies of The Ballad of Sexual Dependency in 2015, when she was deeply addicted to OxyContin. She says she spent some of the money on buying black market OxyContin, as doctors would no longer prescribe her the drug.

In July 2019, Goldin and others from the group Prescription Addiction Intervention Now staged a protest in the fountain at the Louvre in Paris. The protest was to try to persuade the museum to change the name of its Sackler wing, which is made up of 12 rooms.

In November 2019, Goldin campaigned at the Victoria and Albert Museum, London.

Some critics have accused Goldin of making heroin use appear glamorous and of pioneering a grunge style that later became popularized by youth fashion magazines such as The Face and I-D. However, in a 2002 interview with The Observer, Goldin herself called the use of "heroin chic" to sell clothes and perfumes "reprehensible and evil." Goldin admits to having a romanticized image of drug culture at a young age, but she soon saw the error in this ideal: "I had a totally romantic notion of being a junkie. I wanted to be one." Goldin's substance usage stopped after she became intrigued with the idea of memory in her work, "When people talk about the immediacy in my work, that's what its about: this need to remember and record every single thing"

Goldin's interest in drugs stemmed from a sort of rebellion against parental guidance that parallels her decision to run away from home at a young age, "I wanted to get high from a really early age. I wanted to be a junkie. That's what intrigues me. Part was the Velvet Underground and the Beats and all that stuff. But, really, I wanted to be as different from my mother as I could and define myself as far as possible from the suburban life I was brought up in."

Goldin denies the role of voyeur; she is instead a queer insider sharing the same experiences as her subjects: "I'm not crashing; this is my party. This is my family, my history." She insists her subjects have veto power over what she exhibits. In Fantastic Tales Liz Kotz criticizes Goldin's claim that she is just as much a part of what she is photographing rather than exploiting her subjects. Goldin's insistence on intimacy between artist and subject is an attempt to relegitimize the codes and conventions of social documentary, presumably by ridding them of their problematic enmeshment with the histories of social surveillance and coercion, says Kotz. [Her] insider status does nothing to alter the way her pictures convert her audience into voyeurs.

Goldin's The Ballad of Sexual Dependency critiques gender norms ("clichés" as she calls them) by highlighting the collective human desire to form connections regardless of the emotional or physical cost. Throughout Ballad, Goldin showcases some difficult moments for both herself and her friends, especially in relation to their codependency in search of genuine connection. Her friends are a diverse cast consisting of many non-conforming  gender identities and sexualities; Goldin's photography exposes many narratives that most would turn a blind eye to, such as the  intense intimacy and pain of same sex relationships. The AIDS epidemic cost most of Goldin's friends their lives, now preserved in time through the photos that she captured of them. Throughout this period of loss, the desire for connection was further perpetuated and Goldin and her remaining friend group found it essential to remain in close contact with one another. This constant desire for intimacy and connection highlights the similarities amongst people, despite their more obvious differences, emphasizing the societally upheld "differences" between men and women.

Censorship
An exhibition of Goldin's work was censored in Brazil, two months before opening, due to its sexually explicit nature. The main reason was that some of the photographs contained sexual acts performed near children. In Brazil, there is a law that prohibits the image of minors associated with pornography.
The sponsor of the exhibition, a cellphone company, claimed to be unaware of the content of Goldin's work and that there was a conflict between the work and its educational project. The curator of the Rio de Janeiro Museum of Modern Art changed the schedule to accommodate, in February 2012, the Goldin exhibition in Brazil.

Influences

Diane Arbus 
Both Goldin and Diane Arbus celebrate those who live marginal lives. Stills from Variety are compared to Arbus' magazine work; the Variety series portray "the rich collision of music, club life, and art production of the Lower East Side pre and post AIDS period". Both artists ask to reexamine artists' intentionality.

Michelangelo Antonioni 
One of the reasons Goldin began photographing was Michelangelo Antonioni's Blow Up (1966). The sexuality and glamour of the film exerted a "huge effect" on her. Referring to images shown in Ballad, "the beaten down and beaten up personages, with their gritty, disheveled miens, which populate these early pictures, often photographed in the dark and dank, ramshackle interiors, relate physically and emotionally to the alienated and marginal character types that attracted Antonioni."

Larry Clark 
The youths in Larry Clark's Tulsa (1971) presented a striking contrast to any wholesome, down-home stereotype of the heartland that captured the collective American imagination. He turned the camera on himself and his lowlife amphetamine-shooting board of hanger-ons. Goldin would adopt Clark's approach to image-making.

Personal life
Goldin is bisexual.

Publications

Books by Goldin
 The Ballad of Sexual Dependency. New York: Aperture, 1986. .
 Cookie Mueller (exhibition catalogue). New York: Pace/MacGill Gallery, 1991.
 The Other Side. Perseus Distribution Services, 1993. .
 Vakat. Cologne: Walter Konig, 1993.
 Desire by Numbers. San Francisco: Artspace, 1994.
 A Double Life. Zurich: Scalo, 1994.
 Tokyo Love. Tokyo: Hon don do, 1994.
 The Golden Years (exhibition catalogue). Paris: Yvon Lambert, 1995.
 I'll Be Your Mirror (exhibition catalogue). Zurich: Scalo, 1996. .
 Love Streams (exhibition catalogue). Paris: Yvon Lambert, 1997.
 Emotions and Relations (exhibition catalogue). Cologne: Taschen, 1998.
 Ten Years After: Naples 1986–1996. Zurich: Scalo, 1998. .
 Couples and Loneliness. Tokyo: Korinsha, 1998.
 Nan Goldin: Recent Photographs. Houston: Contemporary Arts Museum, 1999.
 Nan Goldin. 55, London: Phaidon, 2001. .
 Devils Playground. London: Phaidon, 2003. .
 Soeurs, Saintes et Sibylles. Editions du Regard, 2005. .
 The Beautiful Smile. First edition. Göttingen: Steidl, 2008. .
 2nd edition. Göttingen: Steidl, 2017. .
 Variety: Photographs by Nan Goldin. Skira Rizzoli, 2009. .
 Eden and After. London: Phaidon, 2014. .
 Diving for Pearls. Göttingen: Steidl, 2016. .

Books with contributions by Goldin
 Emotions & Relations. Foto Series. Cologne: Taschen, 1998. With David Armstrong, Mark Morrisroe, Jack Pierson and Philip-Lorca diCorcia. .
 So the Story Goes: Photographs by Tina Barney, Philip-Lorca DiCorcia, Nan Goldin, Sally Mann, and Larry Sultan. New Haven, Ct: Yale University Press, 2006. .
 Auto Focus: The Self-Portrait in Contemporary Photography. By Susan Bright. London: Thames & Hudson, 2010. . Includes three contributions by Goldin.
 Gudzowaty, Tomasz. Beyond the Body. Edited by Nan Goldin. Göttingen: Steidl, 2017. .

Awards
 2006: Ordre des Arts et des Lettres.
 2007: Hasselblad Award.
 2012: 53rd Edward MacDowell Medal, MacDowell Colony, Peterborough, NH.
 2018:  Royal Photographic Society Centenary Medal and Honorary Fellowship

Collections
 Art Institute of Chicago
 Collection Lambert, New York
 Currier Museum of Art
 Getty Museum, Los Angeles
 Guggenheim Museum, New York
 The Jewish Museum, New York City
 Metropolitan Museum of Art
 Museum of Contemporary Art, Chicago
 Museum of Contemporary Art, Los Angeles
 Museum of Fine Arts, Boston
 Museum of Modern Art, New York
 National Gallery of Australia
 National Museum of Women in the Arts
 San Francisco Museum of Modern Art
 Tate, London

Depiction in film
Photographs shown in the 1986 film Working Girls, as taken by the lead character Molly, were those of Goldin.

An early documentary was made in 1997 on Goldin after her mid-career retrospective at the Whitney Museum of American Art, titled Nan Goldin: In My Life: ART/New York No. 47, by Paul Tschinkel.

The photographs by the character Lucy Berliner, played by actress Ally Sheedy in the 1998 film High Art, were based on those by Goldin.

In 2022, filmmaker Laura Poitras directed a documentary film, All the Beauty and the Bloodshed, about Goldin, which was awarded the Golden Lion at the 79th Venice International Film Festival and was nominated for the Academy Award for Best Documentary Feature.

Solo exhibitions
 The Ballad of Sexual Dependency, screening, Rencontres d'Arles, 1987.
 Nan Goldin, exhibition. Rencontres d'Arles, 1987.
 I'll be Your Mirror, retrospectives, Whitney Museum of American Art, 1996 and traveled to Kunstmuseum Wolfsburg, Germany; Stedelijk Museum, Amsterdam; Fotomuseum Winterthur, Switzerland; Kunsthalle Wien; and National Museum, Prague.
 The Ballad of Sexual Dependency, exhibition and screening, Théâtre Antique. Rencontres d'Arles, 1997.
 Le Feu Follet, Centre Georges Pompidou, Paris, and traveled to Whitechapel Gallery, London, 2001; Museo Nacional Centro de Arte Reina Sofía, Madrid; Fundação de Serralves, Porto, Portugal; Castello di Rivoli, Turin; and Ujazdów Castle, Warsaw.
 The Ballad of Sexual Dependency, exhibition and screening, Guest of honour at Rencontres d'Arles, 2009
 Weekend Plans, Irish Museum of Modern Art, Dublin, 2017
 Sirens, Marian Goodman Gallery, London, 2019/2020.

Exhibitions curated by Goldin

Witnesses: Against Our Vanishing 
Curated by Goldin at Artists Space, Witnesses: Against Our Vanishing (November 16, 1989 – January 6, 1990) invited New York artists to respond to the HIV/AIDS crisis. Artists represented included David Armstrong, Tom Chesley, Dorit Cypis, Philip-Lorca DiCorcia, Jane Dickson, Darrel Ellis, Allen Frame, Peter Hujar, Greer Lankton, Siobhan Liddel, Mark Morrisroe, James Nares, Perico Pastor, Margo Pelletier, Clarence Elie-Rivera, Vittorio Scarpati, Jo Shane, Kiki Smith, Janet Stein, Stephen Tashjian, Shellburne Thurber, Ken Tisa, and David Wojnarowicz. Goldin noted that artists' works varied in response, as "out of loss comes memory pieces, tributes to friends and lovers who have died; out of anger comes explorations of the political cause and effects of the disease."

David Wojnarowicz's essay "Post Cards from America: X-Rays from Hell" in the exhibition's catalogue criticized conservative legislation that Wojnarowicz believed would increase the spread of HIV by discouraging safe sex education. Additionally, Wojnarowicz speaks about the efficacy of making the private public via the model of outing, as he and Goldin believed empowerment begins through self-disclosure. Embracing personal identities then becomes a political statement that disrupts oppressive rules of behavior of bourgeois society – though Wojnarowicz does admit outing may lock a subject into a single frozen identity. Goldin's show, and in particular Wojnarowicz's essay, was met with criticism, leading to the National Endowment of Arts rescinding its support for the publication.

From Desire: A Queer Diary 
Goldin's second curated show, From Desire: A Queer Diary (March 29 – April 19, 1991), was held at the Richard F. Brush Art Gallery at St. Lawrence University, Canton, NY. Artists who were exhibited included David Armstrong, Eve Ashcraft, Kathryn Clark, Joyce Culver, Zoe Leonard, Simon Leung, Robert Mapplethorpe, Robert Windrum, and David Wojnarowicz.

Nan's Guests
Rencontres d'Arles festival, Arles, France. This included the work of thirteen photographers including Antoine d'Agata, David Armstrong, JH Engström, Jim Goldberg, Leigh Ledare, Boris Mikhailov, Anders Petersen and Annelies Strba.

References

External links
 
 Nan Goldin at theCollectiveShift
 

Bisexual artists
LGBT Jews
LGBT people from Washington, D.C.
1953 births
Living people
Jewish American artists
Jewish women artists
Commandeurs of the Ordre des Arts et des Lettres
Artists from Washington, D.C.
Artists from Massachusetts
People from Lexington, Massachusetts
20th-century American photographers
21st-century American photographers
Opioid epidemic
Bisexual women
Fellows of the Royal Photographic Society
20th-century American women photographers
21st-century American women photographers
American LGBT photographers
21st-century American Jews